Hunan Museum of Geology is a geology museum located in Tianxin District, Changsha, Hunan, China.
It is adjacent to the Hunan Youth Activity Center, Hunan Mass Art Museum, and Hunan Science and Technology Museum.

History
Hunan Museum of Geology traces its origins to the former "Specimen Display and Storage Room", founded by geologist Tian Qijuan in 1932.

After the establishment of the Communist State, in 1958, the Exhibition Hall of Geology was founded by the Hunan Office of the Ministry of Geology of China. It was enlarged in 1975 and was renamed Hunan Museum of Geology. On 1 October 1980, Hunan Museum of Geology was officially opened to the public. In 1985, the then vice president Wang Zhen inspected the museum and inscribed the name.

In 2002, Hunan government approved the relocation and reconstruction of Hunan Geological Museum. At the end of 2008, the main project of the new Hunan Museum of Geology was completed. On 22 April 2012, the new Hunan Museum of Geology was officially opened to the public. On 11 December 2017, Hunan Museum of Geology began to close for renovation. On 19 April 2019, the Hunan Museum of Geology reopened and was officially reopened the next day.

On 21 December 2020, it has been categorized as a 2nd Grade National Museum by the China Museum Association.

Architecture
It is mainly divided into six exhibition halls:
Earth Mystery Hall
Geology and Mineral Resources Hall
Geological Environment Hall
Life Evolution Hall
Mineral and Gem Hall
surveying, Mapping and Geographic Information Hall

Transportation
 Take subway Line 1 to get off at Provincial Government station

References

External links
 

1932 establishments in China
Museums established in 1932
Geology museums
Museums in Hunan